Aaron Bold (born April 22, 1985) is a Canadian professional lacrosse player who plays goalie for the Vancouver Warriors of the National Lacrosse League. Bold was drafted in the third round (29th overall) in the 2005 National Lacrosse League entry draft by the Portland Lumberjax.

Bold was named Defensive Player of the Week for his performance in the Stealth's 12-7 win at New York in week 6 of the 2008 NLL season.

Statistics

NLL

References

1985 births
Living people
Canadian lacrosse players
Edmonton Rush players
New England Black Wolves players
Portland LumberJax players
Rochester Knighthawks players
San Jose Stealth players
Saskatchewan Rush players
Sportspeople from Victoria, British Columbia